Zheng Qinwen was the defending champion but chose to participate at the 2022 WTA German Open instead.

Sára Bejlek won the title defeating Jesika Malečková in the final, 6–4, 6–4.

Seeds
All seeds receive a bye into the second round.

Draw

Finals

Top half

Section 1

Section 2

Bottom half

Section 3

Section 4

References

External links
Draws

Macha Lake Open - Singles